George and Dragon may refer to:

 George and Dragon, Great Budworth, a Grade II listed building in Cheshire, England
 The George Inn, Southwark, a public house in Southwark, London, established as George and Dragon in the medieval period
 George and Dragon, Fitzrovia, a public house in the Fitzrovia district of London
 George and Dragon, Salisbury, in Wiltshire, England
 A comic strip in The Dandy

See also

 George and the Dragon (disambiguation)
 Saint George and the Dragon (disambiguation)